Antique Dreams is the seventieth release and first compilation album by Tangerine Dream. Compiled and remixed in 2000, and recorded between 1971 and 1988, it is the third and last of the Tangerine Dream Classics Edition series, following Sohoman and Soundmill Navigator. The album features live, studio and remix elements.

Track listing

Other releases
In October 2007 the album was released as Antique Dream Land as a MP3 download at the Tangerine Dream download shop with a different track listing.

References

2000 live albums
Tangerine Dream live albums